Geneviève Bernatchez  is a Canadian Forces officer who has served as the fifteenth judge advocate general (JAG) since June 27, 2017. She holds the rank of rear admiral in the Royal Canadian Navy. She is the first woman to serve as JAG.

Background 
Bernatchez is a native Gaspé, Québec. She began her military career in 1987, joining the Naval Reserve at HMCS Donnacona in Montreal. She studied law at the Université de Montréal and was called to the bar in 1993; she also holds a masters of international legal studies degree, with a specialization in national security law, from Georgetown University in Washington, D.C. She transferred to the Regular Force in 1997, working as a military lawyer in the JAG's office.

In 1999, Bernatchez deployed with the Canadian Forces Air Command during the Kosovo war.

Awards and decorations
Bernatchez's personal awards and decorations include the following:

File:CPSM Ribbon.png

References 

Living people
Officers of the Order of Military Merit (Canada)
Canadian admirals
Royal Canadian Navy officers
Year of birth missing (living people)